Gavrilov is a lunar impact crater on the far side of the Moon. It lies to the south of the heavily eroded crater Vernadskiy, and north of Vetchinkin.

This is a circular and relatively symmetric crater formation with some erosion of the outer rim. There are some small craterlets in the eastern half of the interior, and a small central rise near the midpoint.

Satellite craters
By convention these features are identified on lunar maps by placing the letter on the side of the crater midpoint that is closest to Gavrilov.

References

 
 
 
 
 
 
 
 
 
 
 
 

Impact craters on the Moon